The Rolling Stones' 1964 1st American Tour was the band's first concert tour of the United States. The tour commenced on June 5 and concluded on June 20, 1964. On this tour, the band supported their first U.S. album The Rolling Stones. The band played eleven shows in total, including two each on 6 and 7 June, and gave several performances on various television shows during the tour. The band also recorded its next single, "It's All Over Now", next British EP, Five by Five, and much of its next US album, 12 x 5, at Chess Studios on 10 and 11 June. 

Tony Scaduto's 1974 work, Mick Jagger: Everybody's Lucifer, gives an excellent overview (pp. 154-164) of this first U.S. tour by the Rolling Stones, including their time in New York City at the beginning of their tour and then their travels several days later into the heartland of America.  "Their fantasies about America smashed against reality," Scaduto tells his readers (p. 159), including an excellent account of the band's performance (pp. 160-161) in Omaha, Nebraska and the band's disappointment with their appearance on Dean Martin's "Hollywood Palace" show.

Tour set list
"Not Fade Away"
"Talkin' 'Bout You"
"I Wanna Be Your Man"
"Hi-Heeled Sneakers"
"Route 66"
"Walking The Dog"
"Tell Me"
"Beautiful Delilah"
"Can I Get a Witness"
"I Just Want To Make Love To You"
"I'm Alright"

Tour dates

References
 Carr, Roy.  The Rolling Stones: An Illustrated Record.  Harmony Books, 1976.  
 Scaduto, Tony.  Mick Jagger:  Everybody's Lucifer.  David McKay Company, 1974.
 Weeks, John.  "From Rolling Stones...to Broken Bones". San Bernardino County Sun, 9 March 2006.
 Donna Coffen wife to Robert "Bob" Coffen who booked the Rolling Stones to perform at Teen Fair of Texas at Joe Freeman Coliseum,  San Antonio, Texas June 6 & 7, 1964 4 performances 

The Rolling Stones concert tours
1964 concert tours
1964 in American music
Concert tours of the United States